Taisuke Miyazaki (宮崎 泰右, born May 5, 1992) is a Japanese football player who plays for Shibuya City FC.

Club statistics
Updated to 23 February 2018.

References

External links
Profile at Tochigi SC

1992 births
Living people
Association football people from Saitama Prefecture
Japanese footballers
J1 League players
J2 League players
J3 League players
Omiya Ardija players
Shonan Bellmare players
Thespakusatsu Gunma players
FC Machida Zelvia players
Tochigi SC players
Vanraure Hachinohe players
Association football defenders